The 1939 Pittsburgh Pirates season was the franchise's seventh season as a professional football club in the National Football League (NFL). The Pirates brought John McNally back for his third year, however, after finishing with a 2–9 record, Owner Art Rooney provided him with support by signing Walt Kiesling during the offseason. Despite this, the Pirates experienced their worst season yet, placing last in the league with a 1–9–1 record. The team just barely tallied a number in the win column, but during Week 11, they beat the Philadelphia Eagles. It was their first win at home in 9 games at Forbes Field (Week 10, 1937).  It was also the final season for the franchise before becoming the "Steelers" the following season.

Offseason

1939 NFL Draft

Pittsburgh's 1939 Draft (like many of the Steelers drafts from these days) was useless. The one player that played longer 1 season was Sam Boyd who played just 3 season for the Pirates/Steelers. The Pirates also traded their first two picks to Chicago and Brooklyn. The Bears would draft future Hall of Famer, QB Sid Luckman, and the Dodgers would select Clarence "Pug" Manders who eventually played 9 years of pro ball.

Regular season

Schedule

Game Summaries

Week 1 (Thursday September 14, 1939): Brooklyn Dodgers 

at Ebbets Field, Brooklyn, New York

 Game time: 
 Game weather: 
 Game attendance: 19,444
 Referee:

Scoring Drives:

 Brooklyn – FG Kercheval 27
 Pittsburgh – Platukis 30 pass from Wheeler (Niccolai kick)
 Brooklyn – Parker 10 run (Kinard kick)
 Brooklyn – Safety, Wheeler tackled in end zone by Hill

Week 2 (Sunday, September 24, 1939): Chicago Cardinals  

at Forbes Field, Pittsburgh, Pennsylvania

 Game time: 
 Game weather: 
 Game attendance: 19,008
 Referee:

Scoring Drives:

 Chicago Cardinals – Goldberg 4 run (Monahan kick)
 Chicago Cardinals – FG Monahan 32

Week 3 (Monday October 2, 1939): Chicago Bears  

at Forbes Field, Pittsburgh, Pennsylvania

 Game time: 
 Game weather: 
 Game attendance: 10,325
 Referee:

Scoring Drives:

 Chicago Bears – Omanski 21 run (Stydahar kick)
 Chicago Bears – Manske 24 pass from Masterson (kick failed)
 Chicago Bears – Maniaci 75 run (kick failed)
 Chicago Bears – Maniaci 4 run (Manders kick)
 Chicago Bears – MacLeod 29 pass from Patterson (kick failed)

Between this game and the next, the Pirates shoehorned in a midseason exhibition game against the McKeesport Olympics, in McKeesport on October 4. The Pirates won that game, 9–6.

Week 4 (Sunday October 8, 1939): New York Giants  

at Forbes Field, Pittsburgh, Pennsylvania

 Game time: 
 Game weather: 
 Game attendance: 9,663
 Referee:

Scoring Drives:

 Pittsburgh – Johnson 1 run (Niccolai kick)
 New York – Cuff 20 pass from Danowski (Cuff kick)
 New York – Cuff 5 pass from Danowski (Cuff kick)

Week 5 (Sunday October 15, 1939): Washington Redskins  

at Griffith Stadium, Washington, DC

 Game time: 
 Game weather: 
 Game attendance: 25,982
 Referee:

Scoring Drives:

 Washington – German 15 run (kick failed)
 Pittsburgh – Francis run (Niccolai kick)
 Washington – German 14 run (Russell kick)
 Pittsburgh – McDonough 3 pass from Tomasetti (Niccolai kick)
 Washington – Farkas 11 run (kick blocked)
 Washington – Farkas 99 pass from Filchock (kick failed)
 Washington – Todd 19 pass from Filchock (Todd kick)
 Washington – Todd 60 run (kick failed)
 Washington – Justice 33 run (kick failed)

Week 6 (Sunday October 22, 1939): Washington Redskins  

at Forbes Field, Pittsburgh, Pennsylvania

 Game time: 
 Game weather: 
 Game attendance: 8,602
 Referee:

Scoring Drives:

 Washington – Millner 56 pass from Filchock (Russell kick)
 Washington – Farkas 40 pass from Filchock (Russell kick)
 Pittsburgh – Boyd pass from McDonough (Niccolai kick)
 Washington – Irwin 25 run (Farkas kick)
 Pittsburgh – Brumbaugh pass from McDonough (Niccolai kick)

Week 7 (Sunday October 29, 1939): Cleveland Rams  

at Cleveland Municipal Stadium, Cleveland, Ohio

 Game time: 
 Game weather: 
 Game attendance: 11,579
 Referee:

Scoring Drives:

 Cleveland – Hall 88 run (Spadaccini kick)
 Pittsburgh – McCullough 9 run (Niccolai kick)
 Pittsburgh – Boyd 27 pass from McCullough (Niccolai kick)
 Cleveland – Drake 3 run (Spadaccini kick)

Week 8 (Monday November 6, 1939): Brooklyn Dodgers  

at Ebbets Field, Brooklyn, New York

 Game time: 
 Game weather: 
 Game attendance: 8,951
 Referee:

Scoring Drives:

 Brooklyn – Schwartz 9 pass from Parker (Kinard kick)
 Pittsburgh – FG Niccolai 25
 Pittsburgh – FG Niccolai 37
 Brooklyn – Parker 28 run (Kinard kick)
 Brooklyn – FG Parker 28
 Pittsburgh – Sortet 22 pass from McCullough (Niccolai kick)

Week 9 (Sunday November 19, 1939): New York Giants  

at Polo Grounds, New York, NY

 Game time: 
 Game weather: 
 Game attendance: 19,372
 Referee:

Scoring Drives:

 New York – Soar 2 run (Strong kick)
 New York – FG Barnum 37
 New York – FG Barnum 28
 New York – FG Strong 24
 Pittsburgh – Brumbaugh 19 run (Niccolai kick)
 New York – Miller 21 run (Barnum kick)

Week 10 (Thursday November 23, 1939): Philadelphia Eagles  

at Shibe Park, Philadelphia, Pennsylvania

 Game time: 
 Game weather: 
 Game attendance: 20,000
 Referee:

Scoring Drives:

 Philadelphia – Carter 65 pass from O'Brien (Murray kick)
 Philadelphia – FG Murray 32
 Pittsburgh – Brumbaugh 1 run (Niccolai kick)

Week 11 (Sunday November 26, 1939): Philadelphia Eagles  

at Forbes Field, Pittsburgh, Pennsylvania

 Game time: 
 Game weather: 
 Game attendance: 8,788
 Referee:

Scoring Drives:

 Pittsburgh – FG Niccolai 28
 Pittsburgh – Johnston 2 run (Niccolai kick)
 Pittsburgh – Tomasetti 1 run (Niccolai kick)
 Pittsburgh – Platukis 37 pss from Brumbaugh (Niccolai kick)
 Philadelphia – O'Brien 2 run (kick blocked)
 Philadelphia – Bukant 3 run (kick blocked)

Standings

References

Pittsburgh Steelers seasons
Pittsburgh Pirates
Pittsburg Pir